William "Chief" Chouneau (September 2, 1888 – September 17, 1946), born William Cadreau, was a Major League Baseball pitcher who appeared in one game for the Chicago White Sox in 1910, and later played for the Negro league Chicago Union Giants. He was a member of the Fond du Lac Band of Lake Superior Chippewa in northeastern Minnesota.
  
A native of Cloquet, Minnesota, the 22-year-old right-hander Chouneau was the starting pitcher on the last day of the 1910 season for a Chicago White Sox club that featured Baseball Hall of Fame hurler Ed Walsh and was led by Hall of Fame manager Hugh Duffy. The opponent was a strong Detroit Tigers team that finished the year in third place.  The White Sox were ahead 1–0 after five innings, but Chouneau gave up two runs in the top of the sixth and was removed from the game with one out.  Pitcher Wild Bill Donovan and the Tigers won the game, 2–1. Chouneau gave up seven hits and no walks in his 5.1 innings pitched.  He had one strikeout, an 0–1 record, and his ERA was 3.38.  At the plate he was 0-for-1 with a walk and a hit by pitch, giving him an on-base percentage of .667.

In 1917, Chouneau pitched for the Negro league Chicago Union Giants. In his one recorded appearance, Chouneau tossed a complete game win, allowing three earned runs. He died in his hometown of Cloquet in 1946 at age 58.

References

External links
 and Seamheads and Retrosheet
SABR biography

1888 births
1946 deaths
People from Cloquet, Minnesota
Ojibwe people
Native American baseball players
Major League Baseball pitchers
Baseball players from Minnesota
Chicago White Sox players
Leland Giants players
Fond du Lac Band of Lake Superior Chippewa
20th-century African-American people